Tankani (Aymara tanka hat and biretta of priests, -ni a suffix to indicate ownership, "the one with a biretta", Hispanicized spelling Tancani) is a  mountain in the Andes of Bolivia. It is located in the Oruro Department, Sajama Province, in the north of the Turco Municipality. Tankani is situated west of the mountain Yaritani and north-east of the mountain Mamaniri.

References 

Mountains of Oruro Department